Bardane is an unincorporated community in Jefferson County, West Virginia, United States. It is located on West Virginia Route 9 between Kearneysville and Shenandoah Junction. Throughout its history, the community has been known as Brown's Crossing and Quincy's Siding.

Bardane most likely was the name of a local settler.

References

Unincorporated communities in Jefferson County, West Virginia
Unincorporated communities in West Virginia